A Reciprocating Gait Orthosis or RGO is a type of Orthosis. Reciprocating Gait Orthoses are used by people who require them to stand or walk.

References

Orthopedic braces